The Icelandic Ministry of Justice and Human Rights was a cabinet-level ministry within the government of Iceland. Since 2 September 2010, the minister had been Ögmundur Jónasson. The institution was previously known as the "Ministry of Justice and Ecclesiastical Affairs".
Since 2011, it was merged with the Ministry of Transport, Communications and Local Government to form the Ministry of Interior.

List of ministers

Ministers of Justice, Church and Human Rights (1904-2010) 
Since Iceland received the Cabinet of Ministers in 1904, the Minister of Justice and the Ministry of Justice went to the ministers in 1917.

Ministers of Interior

Attorney General

See also 

 Justice ministry
 Innanríkisráðherra Íslands (Minister of the Interior of Iceland)
 Politics of Iceland

References

External links
Official site

Iceland, Justice and Human Rights
Justice and Ecclesiastical Affairs
Iceland
Iceland, Justice and Human Rights
Defunct organizations based in Iceland